Great Northern Mountain is a prominent  mountain summit located in Flathead County in the U.S. state of Montana. It is situated in the Flathead National Forest, in the Flathead Range, west of the Continental Divide. Great Northern Mountain is the highest point in the Great Bear Wilderness, and the nearest higher peak is Mount Saint Nicholas, 10.56 miles to the east-northeast in Glacier National Park. The Great Northern Railway is the namesake of the mountain, and the mountain is the namesake of the Great Northern Brewing Company.

Climate 
According to the Köppen climate classification system, the mountain is located in an alpine subarctic climate zone with long, cold, snowy winters, and cool to warm summers. This climate supports the Stanton Glacier on the north slope. Winter temperatures can drop below −10 °F with wind chill factors below −30 °F. Due to its altitude, it receives precipitation all year, as snow in winter, and as thunderstorms in summer. Precipitation runoff from the mountain drains north into Stanton Creek, which is a tributary of Middle Fork Flathead River, and west slope drains to Hungry Horse Reservoir.

Gallery

See also

 Geology of the Rocky Mountains
 Mount Grant

References

External links
 Great Northern Mountain: Weather

Mountains of Flathead County, Montana
Mountains of Montana
North American 2000 m summits